Tigrioides inversa is a moth in the family Erebidae. It was described by Max Gaede in 1925. It is found in New Guinea, where it is found in Papua New Guinea and Papua.

References

Moths described in 1925
Lithosiina